Adana is a city in southern Turkey.

Adana may also refer to:

Places 
 Adana, Álava, a city in the Basque Country, Spain
 Adana Province, a province in Turkey
 Adana Eyalet, one of the eyalet of the Ottoman Empire
 Adana Vilayet, one of the vilayet of the Ottoman Empire

Other 
 Adana (dance), a folk dance in Republic of Macedonia 
 Adana (raga), a rāga in classical music
 Adana kebabı, a long, charcoal grilled, minced meat
 Adana Printing Machines, makers of small printing presses, England